Major-General Cuthbert Graham Fuller  (15 October 1874 – 15 May 1960) was a Royal Engineers officer.

Military career
Fuller was born in to Belfast, Ireland to George Fuller and Antoinette Cumming. He was educated at Beaumont College and the Royal Military Academy, Woolwich. He was commissioned Second Lieutenant in the Royal Engineers on 25 July 1893, and promoted to Lieutenant on 25 July 1896. He served in South Africa during the Second Boer War between 1899 and 1902, and was mentioned in dispatches. On 1 January 1902 he appointed a Deputy Assistant Director of Railways stationed in Transvaal. By 1914, he was a major, and serving in Gallipoli, Egypt, and France during the First World War, earning the brevets of Lieutenant Colonel and Colonel. He became commander of the 130th Infantry Brigade in 1923, commander of the Canal Brigade in Egypt in 1925 and Major-General in charge of administration at Eastern Command in 1929. He became General Officer Commanding, 48th (South Midland) Division, T.A. in June 1931 before retiring in June 1935.

Personal life
In 1912, he married Princess Sophia Vladimirovna, daughter of Prince Vladimir Shahoffsky.

References

1874 births
1960 deaths
Graduates of the Royal Military Academy, Woolwich
Commandeurs of the Légion d'honneur
Companions of the Distinguished Service Order
Companions of the Order of St Michael and St George
Royal Engineers officers
British Army personnel of the Second Boer War
British Army major generals
British Army personnel of World War I
Companions of the Order of the Bath
Military personnel from Belfast